Truncatella californica, common name of the Californian truncatella, is a species of very small amphibious (between sea and land) snail, a gastropod mollusk in the family Truncatellidae.

This species occurs on coastlines in the Eastern Pacific: in California and Baja California, Mexico.

Life Cycle and Mating Behavior 
Members of the order Neotaenioglossa are mostly gonochoric and broadcast spawners. Embryos develop into planktonic trocophore larvae and later into juvenile veligers before becoming fully grown adults.

References

Littorinidae
Molluscs of the Pacific Ocean
Molluscs of North America
Gastropods described in 1857
Taxa named by Ludwig Karl Georg Pfeiffer